The Mount Missim long-eared bat (Nyctophilus shirleyae) is a species of vesper bat found in Papua New Guinea.

Taxonomy and etymology
The Mount Missim long-eared bat was described as a new species by H. Parnaby in 2009. The holotype had been collected in 1988 on Mount Missim by H. Parnaby. The eponym for the species name "shirleyae" was H. Parnaby's mother, Shirley Jean Parnaby. H. Parnaby wrote that she was "a great admirer of the people of the Papua New Guinea nation and its biodiversity," in addition to a supporter of his childhood interest in mammals.

Description
Individuals weigh .

Range and habitat
It is endemic to Papua New Guinea.

Conservation
As of 2020, it is assessed as a data deficient species by the IUCN.

References

Nycteridae
Bats of Oceania
Mammals of Papua New Guinea
Endemic fauna of Papua New Guinea
Bats of New Guinea
Endemic fauna of New Guinea
Mammals described in 2009